Valentin Baur (19 December 1891 – 25 June 1971) was a German politician of the Social Democratic Party (SPD) and member of the German Bundestag.

Life 
Baur had been a member of the SPD since 1911. In 1946 he became district chairman of his party in Swabia and was a member of the party executive committee from 1946 to 1949.

From December 1946 to June 1947, Baur was a member of the state parliament in Bavaria. From 1947 to 1949 Baur was a member of the Economic Council. From 1949 to 1961 he was a member of the German Bundestag. He represented the Augsburg constituency in the Bundestag.

Literature

References

1891 births
1971 deaths
Members of the Bundestag for Bavaria
Members of the Bundestag 1957–1961
Members of the Bundestag 1953–1957
Members of the Bundestag 1949–1953
Members of the Bundestag for the Social Democratic Party of Germany
Members of the Landtag of Bavaria